Harry Donenfeld (October 17, 1893 – February 1, 1965) was an American publisher who is known primarily for being the owner of National Allied Publications, which distributed Detective Comics and Action Comics, the originator publications for the superhero characters Superman  and Batman. Donenfeld was also a founder of the Albert Einstein College of Medicine.

Biography

Early years 
Harry Donenfeld was born into a Jewish family in Iași, Romania, and at the age of five emigrated to the United States of America with his parents and his brother Irving. A few years later the family was joined by Harry's two elder brothers Charlie and Mike. Little is known of his early life, as is common with many people entering America during the days of mass immigration; but the family entered America via Ellis Island and took up residence in New York City in the Lower East Side area.

Donenfeld spent his early life in and out of school, and later in and out of gangs, refusing to settle down or find an occupation like his brothers, who had set up a printing enterprise. Harry became a clothing salesman working in the city, and saw himself as a class above the ordinary working man, and wanted a better life, but preferably without the hard work. After he avoided the draft in 1917, he married Gussie Weinstein in 1918, and thanks to a loan from her parents he was able to open a clothing store in Newark, New Jersey.

Martin Press 
When consumer spending dropped in the US in late 1920, Harry and Gussie's store fell on hard times and by early 1921 they were in debt. Harry's skills of flattery and fast talking were of no use when the country was in economic decline and despite Gussie's best efforts the store went broke. Under pressure to find a steady income, Harry found work with his brothers' printing company, now called Martin Press, as a salesman and fourth partner. During the 1920s Martin Press saw a vast expansion in capital. It is speculated that Harry, through links with gangster Frank Costello, moved alcohol, now illegal during the prohibition, along with legitimate Canadian pulp paper across the border. By 1923 Donenfeld had managed his most important sales deal of his life, acquiring the rights for Martin Press to print six million subscription leaflets for Hearst magazines such as Cosmopolitan and Good Housekeeping. This was partly due to his new underworld contacts having close connections with Hearst newspaper salesman Moe Annenberg. The company was able to move from their earlier downtown location to a twelve-story building in the Chelsea district. 1923 also saw the emergence of the competitive business side of Donenfeld as he took control of Martin Press and forced his two older brothers out of the company, leaving Irving as a minority partner and head printer. Donenfield then changed the company name from Martin Press to Donny Press.

Pulp magazines 

From around 1925, Donenfeld began working with Frank Armer to produce lines of girlie pulps published under the auspices of different company names.  Donenfeld acquired the girlie pulps Ginger Stories, Pep Stories and Snappy Stories from William Clayton, and put them out under the name of DM.  He used the names Merwil and later Irwin Publishing to release more magazines along the same lines: Hot Stories, Joy Stories and Juicy Tales.

In November 1933, Donenfeld drafted Armer to form a company called Super Magazines which ended up specializing in the mixed girlie/genre pulps, Spicy Adventure, Spicy Detective, Spicy Mystery and Spicy Western.   After getting charged with obscenity, and narrowly escaped jail, Donenfeld changed the name of Super Magazines to Culture Publications.  In January 1943, again trying to clean up their image, he changed the word 'Spicy' to 'Speed' in the four magazines with that name.  Speed Western lasted the longest, ceasing publication in 1948.

National Allied Publications 
In 1929, as a favor to an old client, Julius Liebowitz, Donenfeld gave work to Julius' son, Jack. Jack and Harry had little in common, but Jack soon emerged as a man who could run finances. Whereas Harry would promise the world to clients without understanding the economic realities, Jack was bookish and ensured bills were paid on time and helped create a respectability in the firm. Soon the two men were spoken of as a partnership. With the financial backing of Paul Sampliner, Irving Donenfeld as head printer, Harry as salesman and Jack Liebowitz running the finances they launched the Independent News Company in 1932. Now Donenfeld was a distributor as well as a publisher and was now no longer reliant on others to run his business.

In 1935, Major Malcolm Wheeler-Nicholson approached Independent News in a bid to relaunch his comic book New Fun, having lost his previous backers due to poor sales and debts. Donenfeld accepted to distribute the comic but with heavy loss of rights to Wheeler-Nicholson. The major produced two more titles to be handled by Independent News, New Comics and Detective Comics (which would later see the first appearance of Batman), now under the banner of Detective Comics Inc., in which Wheeler-Nicholson was forced to take Donenfeld and Liebowitz as partners. In 1938, Donenfeld sued Wheeler-Nicholson for nonpayment and Detective Comics Inc. went into bankruptcy. Donenfeld then bought up the company and Wheeler-Nicholson's National Allied Publications in their entirety as part of the action.

The fourth publication under National Allied Publications would be Action Comics (1938). Issue #1 introduced the superhero, Superman, created by artist Joe Shuster and writer Jerry Siegel. Donenfeld was initially repelled by the seemingly ridiculous fantasy of the character and ordered it never appear on the cover again. However, the property proved tremendously popular and profitable enough to change his mind by issue 7 to make "Superman" the title's feature. As such, Donenfeld  enjoyed not only healthy comic book sales, but also in merchandising such as toys, costumes and even a radio show featuring the character. At the end of 1941 Donenfeld's comic businesses took in $2.6 million. Shuster and Siegel had sold the rights for the character to National Allied Publications, so as Donenfeld became rich, they continued on flat employee fees. Legal actions between the creative pair and National Allied Publications for compensation would continue for decades to come, but Donenfeld allowed Liebowitz to handle this side of his empire.

American Comics Group 
Donenfeld also owned a stake in a competitor comics publisher, American Comics Group (ACG). A gin rummy and traveling partner of Benjamin W. Sangor, in 1943 Donenfeld helped Sangor start ACG, which published until 1967. (ACG was also distributed by Donenfeld's Independent News.)

Injury and death 
In 1962, the week before he was set to marry his second wife, Donenfeld fell, injuring his head, which resulted in a lack of memory and speech from which he never recovered. He died at a care home in 1965, and is buried in Mount Ararat Cemetery, East Farmingdale, New York.

Donenfeld was posthumously named in 1985 as one of the honorees by DC Comics in the company's 50th anniversary publication Fifty Who Made DC Great.

Family 
Harry's son Irwin Donenfeld was born in 1926, and worked for the firm from 1948 to c. 1968, holding the titles of Editorial Director and Executive Vice President. Harry's daughter Sonia (known as "Peachie") was born in 1927. She was married to Fred Iger in 1947, had 2 children and the marriage ended in divorce after 15 years.

References

Notes

Sources

External links
Harry Donenfeld at Find a Grave
Article on Harry Donenfeld at On The Media

1893 births
1965 deaths
American people of Romanian-Jewish descent
American publishers (people)
Comic book publishers (people)
Romanian emigrants to the United States
Romanian Jews
People from the Lower East Side
DC Comics people
People with traumatic brain injuries